Stan "The Man" Turrentine is the debut album recorded in 1960 by jazz saxophonist Stanley Turrentine originally released on the Time label in 1963, and subsequently re-released on Mainstream as Tiger Tail.

Reception

The Allmusic review by Michael Erlewine states "This tends to be uptempo and mainstream. It lacks the distinctive Turrentine sound that later albums show.".

Track listing
All compositions by Stanley Turrentine except as indicated
 "Let's Groove" - 6:01
 "Sheri" - 4:49
 "Stolen Sweets" (Wild Bill Davis) - 5:20
 "Mild Is the Mood" - 4:59
 "Minor Mood" - 5:10
 "Time After Time" (Sammy Cahn, Jule Styne) - 3:17
 "My Girl Is Just Enough Woman for Me" (Dorothy Fields, Al Hague) - 4:41

Personnel
Stanley Turrentine - tenor saxophone
Sonny Clark (tracks 2, 4 & 7), Tommy Flanagan (tracks 1, 3, 5 & 6) - piano
George Duvivier - bass
Max Roach - drums

References

Stanley Turrentine albums
1963 albums
Mainstream Records albums